The Absinthe Drinker (French: Le Buveur d'absinthe) is an early painting by Édouard Manet, executed c. 1859, considered to be his first major painting and first original work. It is now in the collection of the Ny Carlsberg Glyptotek in Copenhagen, Denmark.

Background and history
Manet became a student in the studio of Thomas Couture from 1850 but over time he grew to dislike his master's Salon style and thereafter set up his own studio in 1856.   Little of Manet's earliest work survives and much may have been destroyed by Manet himself.

The Absinthe Drinker is a full-length portrait of an alcoholic chiffonnier (rag-picker) named Collardet who frequented that area around the Louvre in Paris. Collardet is painted in mostly brown, grey and black tones. The subject is standing, wears a black top hat and is wrapped in a brown cloak, like an aristocrat; he leans on a ledge with the empty bottle discarded on the floor by his feet. Manet later added a half-full glass of absinthe on the ledge. Manet may have taken inspiration from the poem Le Vin des chiffonniers ("The rag-pickers' wine") in Charles Baudelaire's 1857 collection Les Fleurs du mal, from the paintings of ordinary people by Diego Velázquez (particularly his paintings of Aesop and Menippus), and from Watteau's L'Indifférent.

Near the completion of the painting, Manet showed the work to his former master. Asked for his opinion, Couture is said to have retorted: "An absinthe drinker!  And they paint abominations like that!  My poor friend, you are the absinthe drinker. It is you who have lost your moral sense." 

The Absinthe Drinker was the first work that Manet submitted to the Paris Salon in 1859.  It was rejected with only Eugène Delacroix voting in its favour. Part of the reason for its rejection may be its subject; absinthe was thought to be addictive and considered morally degenerate, and this was one of the earliest depictions of absinthe in art. The painting, however, also has technical faults; it is unevenly finished, with brushstrokes visible in places, and the legs join awkwardly with the subject's body. According to art historian Charles F. Stuckey, the painting presented in 1859 may have been significantly different and inferior to the current version, with the subject's legs and the absinthe glass not depicted.  Refusal of other works by young painters led eventually to the creation of the Salon des Refusés in 1863.

Manet continued to revise the work after 1859 and inserted the same cloaked figure into his 1862 painting The Old Musician.  The original full-length portrait was cut down to three-quarter length by 1867 when it was exhibited by Manet with 56 other works in a self-funded retrospective at the Exposition Universelle held in Paris, but extended again by 1872 when Manet sold The Absinthe Drinker and 23 other works to the art dealer Paul Durand-Ruel. The glass of absinthe was a late addition, between 1867 and 1872.

The painting was sold to opera singer Jean-Baptiste Faure in 1906 and exhibited at the Statens Museum for Kunst in Copenhagen in 1914 when it was acquired for the Ny Carlsberg Foundation.  It was one of the first modern works added to the collection at the Ny Carlsberg Glyptotek, where it is still held.

Possible inspirations

See also
 L'Absinthe by Edgar Degas

Notes

References
 Manet's Silence and the Poetics of Bouquets, James Henry Rubin, pp. 36-38.
 Hideous Absinthe: A History of the Devil in a Bottle, Jad Adams, pp. 35-38.
 Manet's Modernism: Or, The Face of Painting in the 1860s, Michael Fried, p. 34.

External links

Paintings by Édouard Manet
1859 paintings
Absinthe
Food and drink paintings
Paintings in the collection of the Ny Carlsberg Glyptotek
19th-century paintings in Denmark